Lost in a Moment is the third album by Norwegian musician Lene Marlin. It was released on 13 June 2005.

"My Lucky Day" was used prominently in a 2007 Kinder Surprise television commercial, with on-screen credit to Marlin.

Track listing

The CD+DVD Taiwanese edition also adds "Still Here" as a bonus track.

Charts

References

External links
Lene Marlin Official Website

2005 albums
Lene Marlin albums